Pierre of the Plains is a 1914 film based on the novel Pierre and his People by Gilbert Parker. Edgar Selwyn adapted the novel into the play Pierre of the Plains in 1908 and it made Elsie Ferguson a Broadway star.

Benjamin S. Kutler wrote the scenario. The film stars Selwyn himself, The supporting cast features Dorothy Dalton, Sydney Seaward, and Lawrence B. McGill.

Other film adaptations of the novel/play 
Elsie Ferguson herself appeared in Paramount's version in 1918 under the title Heart of the Wilds, directed by Marshall Neilan. The play was filmed in 1942, again titled Pierre of the Plains.

References

External links

1914 films
1914 drama films
Films based on works by Gilbert Parker
American silent feature films
Films based on short fiction
American black-and-white films
Silent American drama films
1910s American films